Vytautas Edmundas Čekanauskas (13 May 1930, Šiauliai – 7 July 2010, Vilnius) was a Lithuanian architect, professor of the Vilnius Academy of Art.

In 1974 he, together with colleagues, was awarded the Lenin Prize in architecture for the design of Lazdynai, a microdistrict of Vilnius.

In 2000 he was awarded the Officer's Cross of the Order of the Lithuanian Grand Duke Gediminas.

Works
Lazdynai
Church of St. John Bosco, Vilnius
Building of the Government of Lithuania

External links

1930 births
2010 deaths
Burials at Antakalnis Cemetery
People from Šiauliai
Lithuanian architects
Lenin Prize winners
Officer's Crosses of the Order of the Lithuanian Grand Duke Gediminas
Academic staff of the Vilnius Academy of Arts